Francis Marmande (born 1945) is a French author, musician and journalist for the French newspaper Le Monde since 1977. Marmande currently serves as the director of a modern literature laboratory (Littérature au présent) at University of Paris VII: Denis Diderot.

Marmande graduated in 1966 from the École Normale Supérieure in Saint-Cloud. A jazz critic, Marmande also plays double bass and has recorded with the Jac Berrocal Group. He was a contributor to Jazz Magazine from 1971 to 2000, which he also helped illustrate from 1976 to 1994.

Since 2006, he has had a regular column in Le Monde, writing on topics such as jazz, bullfighting, and literature.

Bibliography
Bataille politique, Presses Universitaires de Lyon, 1985.
L’Indifférence des ruines, Parenthèses, 1985.
La Mémoire du chien, Fourbis, 1993.
Œillet rouge sur le sable, avec Florence Delay, Fourbis, 1994.
La Perfection du bonheur, Descartes & Cie, 1994  
Le Chemin des dames, Fourbis, 1995.
La Housse partie, Fourbis, 1997.
La Chambre d’amour, éditions du Scorff, 1997.
Suzanne un jour, avec Rodrigo de Zayas, Esprit des péninsules, 1999.
Chutes libres, Farrago, 2000.
La Police des caractères, Descartes & Cie, 2001.
Curro, Romero, y Curro Romero, Verdier, 2001 
À partir du lapin, Verdier, 2002 
Rocío, Verdier, 2003

References

External links
Francis Marmande profile via Le Monde diplomatique

1945 births
Living people